Boa Ventura, Portuguese for Bonaventure, may refer to the following places:

Boa Ventura, Paraíba, Brazil
Boa Ventura de São Roque, Paraná, Brazil
Boaventura, São Vicente, a parish in the municipality of São Vicente, Madeira, Portugal